Pitter Enrique Valderrama Peña (born 14 April 1986) is a Peruvian politician. A member of the Peruvian Aprista Party, he is currently a member of the party's National Political Commission since July 2021.

As a journalist, he collaborates as a columnist for Expreso. He is also the founder of the political affairs portal Punto de Encuentro.

Political career

Valderrama is a member of the Peruvian Aprista Party since 2010. He was chosen to run for the Lima Metropolitan Council in the 2010 municipal election, but the party's list with Carlos Roca as mayoral nominee was ultimately withdrawn.

From 2011 to 2012, Valderrama served as General Secretary of the Aprista University Command at the Pontifical Catholic University of Peru, where he studied law at the time.

On 21 July 2021, Valderrama was appointed directly by party leader César Trelles as a member of the National Political Commission chaired by former congressman Mauricio Mulder. He is considered a strong contender for the leadership of the APRA within an influx of young leaders for the party's renewal.

References

Peruvian politicians
1986 births
Living people
American Popular Revolutionary Alliance politicians
People from Lima